Giannis Skarimpas, Giannis Skarimbas  or Yiannis Skarimbas (September 28, 1893 – January 21, 1984), was a Greek writer, dramatist, and poet.

Biography
He was born in Agia Efthymia near Amfissa (now part of Delphi municipality). He went to school in Aigio and Patras, went through military service in the 5/42 Evzone Regiment and was then appointed head of the customs office at Eretria (then called Nea Psara). In 1915 he resettled to Chalkida, where he spent most of his life. He had his first works published in newspapers in Athens and Chalkida under the pen name Kallis Esperinos (Κάλλις Εσπερινός). His first publication under his own name came in 1929, when he published his novel O Kapetan Sourmelis o Stouraitis (Ο καπετάν Σουρμελής ο Στουραΐτης Ω) in the Ellinika Grammata (Greek Letters) magazine. He died on January 21, 1984, in Chalkida.

Works
Kaimoi sto Griponisi (Καημοί στο Γριπονήσι), collected stories, 1930
Mariampas (Μαριάμπας), novel, 1935
To Solo tou Figaro (Το σόλο του Φίγκαρω, Το σόλο του Figaro = Figaro's Solo), novel, 1938
Eaftoulides (Εαυτούληδες), poem, 1950
O Ichos tou Kodonos (Ο ήχος του κώδωνος), stage play, 1950
I Peripolos Z (Η περίπολος Ζ), chronicle from the First World War, 1972
To Waterloo Dyo Geloion (Το Βατερλώ δύο γελοίων), novel 1959
I Mathitevomeni Ton Takounion (Η μαθητευομένη των τακουνιών), three novellas, 1961
Fygi Pros ta Empros (Φυγή προς τα εμπρός), novel 1976
Voidangeloi (Βοϊδάγγελοι), poem 1968
Apantes Stichoi (Άπαντες στίχοι), poem 1970
O Sevalie Servan tis Kyrias (Ο Σεβαλιέ σερβάν της Κυρίας), stage play, 1971
To '21 kai i Alitheia, I Trapoula, Oi Galatades (Το '21 και η αλήθεια, Η Τράπουλα, Οι Γαλατάδες), history 1971 - 1977
Tyflovdomada sti Chalkida (Τυφλοβδομάδα στη Χαλκίδα), work 1973
Treis Adeies Karekles (Τρεις άδειες καρέκλες = Three Empty Chairs), work 1976
Ta Poulia me to Lasticho (Τα πουλιά με το λάστιχο), chronography, 1978
Ta Kangouro (Τα Καγκουρώ), stage play, 1979
Spazokefalies ston Ourano (Σπαζοκεφαλιές στον ουρανό), 1979
Anti-Karagkiozis o Megas (Αντι-Καραγκιόζης ο Μέγας), stage play, 1977
I Kyria tou Trainou (Η κυρία του τραίνου), stage play, 1980
O Pater Synesios (Ο Πάτερ Συνέσιος), stage play, 1980

External links
http://www.mikrosapoplous.gr/skaribas.htm
https://web.archive.org/web/20041213020841/http://genesis.ee.auth.gr/dimakis/NeaAriadni/17-18/4.html
TO SOLO TOU GIANNI SKARIMPA, a documentary shot in Chalkida about Giannis Skarimpas

1893 births
1984 deaths
People from Amfissa
20th-century Greek dramatists and playwrights
20th-century Greek poets
20th-century Greek novelists